Chamberlain, Hrdlicka, White, Williams & Aughtry, PC, known as Chamberlain Hrdlicka, is a multi-practice, tax-focused American law firm founded in Houston, Texas with offices in Atlanta, Houston, Philadelphia, and San Antonio. About half of our attorneys are in our nationally-ranked tax practices.

Founded in 1965, Chamberlain Hrdlicka has achieved national prominence in tax law. The law firm has expanded into a number of practice areas including appellate law, commercial litigation, condemnation & eminent domain, construction law, corporate, securities & finance, employee benefits & executive compensation, energy & maritime, ERISA, estate & income tax planning & estate administration, exempt organizations, federal white collar criminal defense, immigration, insurance law, intellectual property, internal investigations, international, labor & employment, probate & fiduciary litigation, qualified opportunity zones, real estate, state and local tax planning & controversy, tax planning & business transactions, and tax.

The Chamberlain Hrdlicka Atlanta office was founded by David Aughtry in 1986 that has grown to over 50 attorneys including Hale Sheppard, a tax controversy and international tax shareholder. The Philadelphia office was founded in 2007 and the San Antonio office was founded in 2011. Larry Campagna is the managing partner of Chamberlain Hrdlicka and John Meredith is the chief operating officer.

The firm represents both public and private companies, including Fortune 500 companies, as well as individuals. As of 2023, Chamberlain Hrdlicka employs over 150 attorneys in four offices across the country including Atlanta, Houston, Philadelphia and San Antonio. The Atlanta and Houston offices have been named Best Places to Work by the Atlanta Business Chronicle and Houston Business Journal.

Rankings
U.S. News & World Report Best Law Firms ranks Chamberlain Hrdlicka in 2023 as one of the nation's best law firms for tax law, tax litigation, construction law, construction litigation, immigration, trusts & estates, commercial litigation, employee benefits (ERISA), real estate, criminal defense white collar, employment law - management, labor law - management, litigation - insurance law, appellate, insurance law, and nonprofit/charities law. Similarly, Chambers and Partners describes Chamberlain Hrdlicka as a preeminent tax litigation law firm and ranks it among the best U.S. tax law firms. 

World Tax ranks Chamberlain Hrdlicka as one of the world's leading tax firms and Legal 500 ranks Chamberlain as one of the nation's most elite tax controversy law firms. Finally, TaxProf Blog has recognized Chamberlain Hrdlicka as one of the country's best tax controversy law firms.

Chamberlain Hrdlicka History
Chamberlain Hrdlicka's first office was founded in Houston, Texas in 1965 by Hank Chamberlain and George Hrdlicka, two veterans of the United States Department of Justice Tax Division. The Firm represents both public and private companies, as well as individuals and family-owned businesses across the nation. 

Chamberlain Hrdlicka handles a wide variety of legal issues including appellate law, bankruptcy, commercial & probate litigation, construction law, corporate, data security & privacy, employee benefits, energy & maritime law, ERISA, estate planning & administration, exempt organizations, federal white collar criminal defense, immigration, intellectual property, international, labor & employment, real estate, securities and finance, state & local tax, tax controversy, and tax planning & business transactions.

References

Law firms based in Houston
Law firms based in Atlanta
Law firms based in Philadelphia
Companies based in San Antonio
Law firms established in 1965